Clarke Lewis (November 8, 1840 – March 13, 1896) was an American educator, Civil War veteran, and politician who served two terms as a United States representative from Mississippi from 1889 to 1893.

Biography 

He was born in Huntsville, Alabama. He moved with his mother to Noxubee County, Mississippi in 1844 where he attended the district schools and Somerville Institute and also engaged in teaching for several years.

Lewis entered the Confederate Army in February 1861 and served until the close of the American Civil War. After the war, he resumed teaching in 1865. He was also employed as a clerk in a store in 1866 and 1867 and engaged in mercantile and agricultural pursuits 1867–1879.

Congress 
Lewis was a member of the Mississippi House of Representatives in 1878. He was elected as a Democrat to the Fifty-first and Fifty-second Congresses (March 4, 1889 – March 3, 1893).

Later career and death 
After leaving Congress, he resumed agricultural pursuits. He died near Macon, Mississippi in 1896 and was buried in the Odd Fellows Cemetery, Macon, Mississippi.

Notes

References

 Speech of Hon. Clarke Lewis of Mississippi, Debate in the House of Representatives in The Money Question of the 52nd Congress (March 22, 1892), accessed November 7, 2017..

1840 births
1896 deaths
Politicians from Huntsville, Alabama
Democratic Party members of the Mississippi House of Representatives
Democratic Party members of the United States House of Representatives from Mississippi
19th-century American politicians
People from Macon, Mississippi
Military personnel from Huntsville, Alabama